Everardo Múzquiz (born 31 January 1912, date of death unknown) was a Mexican sprinter. He competed in the men's 200 metres at the 1932 Summer Olympics.

References

External links
 

1912 births
Year of death missing
Athletes (track and field) at the 1932 Summer Olympics
Mexican male sprinters
Olympic athletes of Mexico
Place of birth missing
20th-century Mexican people